Ram Prasad Nautiyal (1 August 1905 – 24 December 1980) was an Indian independence activist and politician.  He was one of the prominent freedom fighters from Uttrakhand and   probably the only major name who worked in Himalayan ranges itself, returning from the cities like Delhi, Kolkata, Lahore etc., where it was a bit easier to sustain and campaign in comparison to dangerously scattered hill areas.

Early life 

Ram Prasad Nautiyal was born to Shri. Gauri Datta Nautiyal and Smt. Devaki Devi on 1 August 1905 at Kanda village of Beiroankhal block in Pauri Garhwal Uttrakhand (part of the then United province of Agra & Awadh)   Though Ram Prasad belonged to an average Pahari family, any how they managed him to study in DAV School in Dehradun, where during a speech by Sarojini Naidu some students started chanting pro-freedom slogans; Ram Prasad was one of them. For this they were fined Rs. 50 each and in case of non-compliance three weeks of imprisonment was dictated, as Ram Prasad did not have any money to pay, he had to remain in jail for three weeks. Later on he was rusticated; since he did not stop his sloganeering even after being incarcerated.

A short stint with British Army 

After being rusticated he left for meerut where he joined the British Army as a record keeper and was sent to Balochistan in supply division. There he saved Colonel Abbott from an attack by a Balochi Sardar named Torkhan. Colonel Abbott helped in learning horse riding which made him eligible to move to 63 mobile core in Rawalpindi (Now in Pakistan).

One day while two British army battalions (2/8 Punjab regiment led by colonel Davis and 5 Royal Maratha regiment headed by colonel Valley) were engaged in a proxy war some fugitives from Royal Russian army attacked them, and several British soldiers got killed. Ram Prasad Nautiyal along with his two companions were given a responsibility to inform colonel Davis who got stuck on the other side of the dried river belt where exercise was going on. Ram Prasad Nautiyal successfully completed the task , which   impressed Colonel Davis, who promoted as adjutant quarter master. This experience with British army proved handy for him in future.

Lala Lajpat Rai's death and impact on Ram Prasad Nautiyal 

While serving in British Army he got to read an article in Arya Gadget (published from Lahore) on Lala Lajpat Rai's death. At that time Bheemsen Sachhar was the editor of the paper. There was a line written in the article which said, "I am born in an enslaved country, where any ordinary police officer can kill me beating with canes."

Death of Lala Ji in the hands of an ordinary British officer and these mind boggling articles in the newspapers shook his conscience and he decided to leave British Army.

After being released from army he met Dr. Kichloo and Dr. Gopinath who were leading this freedom struggle in Lahore (now in Pakistan), they advised the young man to go to Kolkata and participate in Congress cession there. Ram Prasad reached to Kolkata before the scheduled date of the conference; there he met Dr. S. S. Hardikar, who admitted him to Congress service committee. Meanwhile, an agitation was in progress at Grand Peninsula railways, Ram Prasad and his companions were caught distributing pamphlets supporting the agitation. All of them were arrested and taken to Fort-William fort from there they were sent to jail, in jail he came across Shripad Amrit Dange, Kedarnath Sehgal, Barrister Joglekar, Achyuta Patvardhan and many other leaders. In the meantime a compromise between Congress and British government was done and all the political prisoners were let off a week before the scheduled date of the annual conference of Indian National Congress in Kolkata.

After the conference was over Dr. Hardikar selected four Satyagrahis for UP, Ram Prasad Nautiyal was one of them. They were sent to Hugli for six months for training. After his training was over he was sent to Lahore. In those days Bhagat Singh, Rajguru, Battukeshwar Datta, Sukhdeve and Jagdish used to visit Lahore frequently, as their visits were planned secretly so nobody could meet them. In 1930 when annual congress cession was scheduled to be held in Lahore at the bank of river Ravi, Ram Prasad was one of the members of service committee (though he had to flee before the cession could start in 1929, itself). In this cession a proposal for complete freedom was taken up (on 26 January 1930).
There was a student leader named Pushpa (niece of principle Chhabildas and daughter of an inspector in British CID) from D.A.V. College, she was the head of women service committee, Ram Prasad was completely indulged in his anti-government activities, and an arrest warrant was already circulated to capture him, this information was sent to him secretly by the women leader. As soon as Ram Prasad got the news, he left Lahore at midnight in a disguise and started his journey on foot, via Pathankot he reached Dalhousie and then Chamba district of today's Himachal.

Later on he moved to a Mathh in Sahpur, there he met Sukhdev and Jagdish Chandra Jain who were absconding from Lahore conspiracy. After meeting them he shifted to a nearby Arya Samaj Temple and was arrested from there. He was sent to Lahore jail where many young freedom fighters were incarcerated and were being tortured to confess their involvement in the murder of British officer Saunders. British police started torturing Ram Prasad to confess his crime and tried to make him one of the accused in the case, when they failed to do so they tried to convince him to become an informer, but everything proved futile and British police had to release him on 21 December 1929 from Lahore jail.

Civil Disobedience in Garhwal and Kumanyun 

After being released, he directly reached to the campus of annual Congress cession at the bank of Ravi. Where he was given a duty to look after the visitor camp for the delegates from UP. Here he got a chance to meet people from Garhwal and Kumayun, prominently Har Govind Pant, Kumayun Keshri Badri Dutta Pandey, Victor Mohan Joshi, Devi Singh Kauriya, Anusuya Prasad Bahuguna, Kripa Ram Mishra Manhar and may others. Later he was appointed as an inspector to Satyagraha guides of Kumanyun and was sent to Ranikhet. He ran several camps in Garhwal and Kumayun region.

He opened his office in Dogadda (nearby Kotdwar) and continued his activities. By this time he got famous as "Kaptaan (captain) Shahab" amongst fellow revolutionaries. Civil disobedience was on its peak and entire country was following Gandhi ji, Ram Prasad Nautiyal decided to propagate this message to the public and make them aware about their rights. In several public meetings held by him and his group they persuaded public to protest against increased taxes that was dictated by British authorities. Consequently, 76 revenue and Thokedars resigned from their posts and started supporting revolutionaries in their fight against British government.

Meanwhile, forest department started wire fencing around Pilan river which resulted in closing of the grazing land for the cattle breaded by the public living in the villages scattered around those lower part of Himalayan ranges. Ram Prasad Nautiyal rallied against it and uprooted the wire fencing. While an arrest warrant was circulating for him he kept his activities being underground, though police succeeded in arresting him from Bhatwadon village in Rikhnikhal block of Pauri district. He was arrested under section 208 of Indian penal court and was sent to two years of rigorous imprisonment.

I am not a British Citizen 

While returning from a Prabhat-Pheri from ChunaDhar (a little ahead of Dogadda) all the Satyagrahis were chanting pro-freedom slogans, suddenly came deputy commissioner of the police Ibbotson with his team. Ganga Singh Tyagi a class 9th student was holding tri-color in his hand and shouted, "Bharat Mata ki Jai", "Vande Matram".

This made Ibbotson very angry, he started flogging the child. Ganga Singh fell unconscious, even at this Ibbotson came off his horse and started booting the child. On seeing this Ram Prasad got infuriated, he got DCP by his collar and flung him down the road. Luckily Ibbotson got hold of an uprooted tree and saved his life. Police tried to catch Ram Prasad but he fled away to Chunadhar hills. Later on when he was arrested, he was brought to Justice MS Gill in chains, who asked to immediately remove his chains and hand calves.

Ibbotson's lawyer started reading the charge sheet; Judge asked Ram Prasad, "Do you want to say something?"

He said "When Ibbotson is available in the court not as a DCP but as a petitioner than why he does not come to witness box and narrate the incident."

The judge looked at Mr. Ibbotson and he had to come to witness box, and narrated entire incident truthfully. Now judge looked at Ram Prasad and said, "what do you want say in your defense?"

Ram Prasad replied, "I don't consider myself to be a British citizen and saying anything in British court would be a dishonor for me. Thus he refused to be a part of any legal procedure with British authorities saying that they have no right to rule his country and their rule is unlawful.

Showing black flags to then governor of the United Province Malcolm Hailey 
It is in the year 1932, that the then British Governor Malcolm Haley (Governor of United Provinces from 10-08-1928 to 05-12-1934) decided to visit Pauri, as soon as the news was received in this regard Ramprasad and fellow revolutionaries prepared a plan to show black flags to Governor Haley and boycott him. In the first week of September, 1932, a meeting of revolutionaries was held in the underground office of Ramprasad at Duggada. It was decided in the discussion that entry of too many a people would not be possible in Pauri district headquarters and if more than one or two people try to enter, the administration may get suspicious and the plan may also fail. In the end the passionate and experienced Jayanand Bhartiya was chosen to carry out this work, he immediately agreed. On 5 September 1932, Ramprasad reached Pauri with Jayanand, where they stayed at the house of Advocate Kotwal Singh Negi. Here the Tricolor flag brought separately was prepared by adding and pieces of black cloth were also kept together. Early in the morning on 6 September 1932, Ramprasad, Jayanand, and companions reached near the district headquarters where a meeting was to be organized in honor of Governor Haley by inviting the pro-British 'Aman Sabha' and some press organizations. Jayanand and Anusuya Prasad Bahuguna, who disguised as planned, quietly joined the meeting and as soon as it was time for Malcolm Haley to address, he raised slogans of 'Vande Mataram!', 'Congress Zindabad!', 'Aman Sabha Murdabad!', waving the Tricolor and marched towards the stage. Meanwhile, Ramprasad and his fellow started their sloganeering – 'Governor go back!'; They managed to divert the attention of the police by waving black flags. Thus Jayanand got an opportunity to climb the stage with the cry of 'Long live Mother India!'. However, while climbing the stage he got arrested by the police.

In order to save Haley, most of the policemen ran towards the stage, This gave an opportunity to Ramprasad and fellow revolutionary to escape as planned.

By this day, overall about 664 comrades of Chamoli and Pauri mandals of Ramprasad's group had been in incarcerated. The responsibility of looking after the families of all these prisoners was on the shoulders of Ramprasad and other companions. In the end Ramprasad was also caught in order to provide aid to the families of other revolutionaries including Jayanand and was sentenced to one year rigorous imprisonment with a fine of 200 rupees. This incident has also been recorded in the then government documents. In order to reduce the impact of this incident and to avoid grumbling in front of the higher authorities, the account of black flags and some revolutionaries being able to escape by dodging the police were covered up by the local British administration.

Gujdu- The Bardoli of Garhwal 

As the plan to liberate Lansdowne didn't succeed, it was difficult to stay underground in Duggada. Ramprasad was considered to be the mastermind of this conspiracy. So he turned to Gujdu-patti, his second hideout in South Garhwal. It had emerged as the second largest recruitment center of Satyagrahis and volunteers in Garhwal after Duggada. The British government increased the collection of revenue with the aim to stop the activities of the Satyagrahis and creating fear in the area and started implementing it strictly. Ramprasad mobilized the local farmers and other intellectuals in protest against this and in the second half of the year 1942, a big movement took shape, Revenue and Police Department started oppressing the movement with incarceration of the locals in bulk, seizing their houses and properties. This movement of farmers is called 'Gujdu movement' or 'Bardoli of Garhwal'. Incidentally, the village 'Barat Talla' of Gujdu Patti was also the village of the in-laws of Ramprasad Nautiyal and parental home to his life partner 'Shyama Devi'. During this movement, Thansingh Rawat and Shishram Pokhriyal (Elder brother of Shyama Devi) also contributed a lot in mobilizing the local people. On 8 November 1942, Bhairav Dutt Dhulia was arrested for helping the agitators.

An attempt for Lansdowne's independence 

In 1942 Gandhi started the Quit India movement and gave a slogan of "do or die". In this spree of protests, rallies and violent struggle many revolutionaries captured several strategically important places and offices throughout the country. Ram Prasad Nautiyal and his fellow rebellions had some meetings in the juggles of Pauri Garhwal region, they concluded that it was best time to take control back from British establishment in the area. They divided entire Garhwal and Chamoli region in four zones and created four teams for the respective zones. A central committee of twenty one people was also conceived to handle the entire operation; As Ram Prasad Nautiyal was a military trained person he held the main responsibility in the committee. In the final meeting of central committee the plan was given finishing touches, and a draft was issued for all the four zones established earlier. The plan said, they would first snap all the telephone lines connecting Lansdowne to remaining country, then Lansdowne court will be seized and S.D.M. Mr. Ambadatta would be declared to be the D.M., finally they would take control of the treasury and thus hand over entire administration to the public. For interim governance an executive committee will be stablished under fellow Pratap Singh Negi.

Unfortunately, in this important meeting Mr. Mangatram Khantwal was also present; who while on his way back home leaked the entire plan to a British agent named Govind Singh Maalgujaar, the later one straightly went to D.C. Ferneeds in Lansdowne and informed him about possible coup. Mr. Ferneeds ordered to seal all the routes leading to Lansdowne, army was deployed on Chaumasun bridge and Bandhar bridge, licensee arm holders were summoned and entire administration was handed over to security personnel who now had a free run. Now they knew that it would be very difficult to face armed forced deployed in huge numbers throughout the region, however they kept working on their plan.

Taking a lead Ram Prasad Nautiyal reached to Karnaprayag with his supporters, brock into the PWD store there and picked seven cartons of dynamite, by walking hundreds of kilometer the explosives were brought to Beironkhal block, from there it was distributed to all four zones established earlier. On 27 August 1942, revolutionaries got all the schools and government offices closed in the area, thousands of people started marching towards Lansdowne. Ram Prasad Nautiyal himself headed through Toonikhal with 80 odd people, and then he sent a team of 50 people to Dhura area to snap telephone lines connecting Lansdowne. While cutting the telephone wires one of their associate got caught into electric wiring and a heavy shock of the electric current flung him down the hill.

Meanwhile, authorities and army started witch-hunting, hundreds of people were incarcerated. On getting the news of causality in the process of snapping telephone lines Ram Prasad Nautiyal and his associates started a search for the dead-body of their companion, Ram Prasad himself lifted the body on his shoulder brought it to a nearby river bank and quietly performed the rituals with changing of Vande Mataram in the night itself.

Thousands of people were marching towards Lansdowne for the planned coup; might be in a day or two it could have resulted in unavoidable clashes between British security personnel and common public but sensing the fact that this bloodshed might not result in any good, Ram Prasad decided to stop marching teams wherever they were.
Risking his life he kept running pillar to post and met the people who have already marched ahead in different places, convinced them to go back for time being, and accommodated thousands of people who could not return immediately. The plan got failed but it irked British government too much, they started arresting who so ever they wanted, tortured people, illegal detentions were common. The situation deteriorated to such a low that when British agents did not find any male member in a house they used to sexually assault female members of the families. To avenge this, people killed a British officer and threw his dead-body into a river in Kumartha village; Police charge-sheeted a named Kantichand Uniyal for this who fled to the jungles of Badrinath, where he died of cold and hunger. Later on when Ram Prasad Nautiyal was arrested he was informed that due to his activities government had to call army and in total it took Rs. 84 Crore (today it could translate into millions of dollars) to suppress the revolt.

Death of his toddler son and ailing father 

While Ram Prasad Nautiyal was indulged in anti-British activities from the jungles of Kolaggad keeping himself underground, he was informed that his father was ill and might die any time, after confirming the news he came to his village, hungry from days he ate leftover food. He saw his father lying unconscious having a bed sheet over his face; he touched his father's feet, asked his mother for blessings and to allow him to leave. But family and relatives told him that his father might not live even by morning, so being eldest it was his duty to perform the rituals (at least to burn the pyre). Ram Prasad agreed to stay by 4:00 AM, while he woke up at 2:00 AM, a team of 200 police personnel sieged the house. It was decided that he must not be touched till morning on the condition of his surrender to the officials; however his family denied his presence at home.

Nayab Tesildar Chandan Singh came up the stairs and shouted "Kaptaan Sahib, you are under arrest!"

Tehsildar's arrogant shouting made Ram Prasad angry; he broke down the door of the room where his mother locked him to avoid his direct confrontation with heavily armed police force. He came out to the gallery grabbed Chandan Singh by his neck and threw him down the floor. While Chandan Singh fell down he opened fire at Ram Prasad, who retaliated with his pistol. On hearing gun fire his toddler son (who was already ill) fled to the nearby Manduaa fields. Entire family was traumatized on seeing such a heavy police force and the kid fell unconscious. In the morning Ram Prasad Nautiyal asked police team to arrange for Dhol-Damau and Ransingha for his departure and told that he was not an ordinary thief but a revolutionary. On seeing his aggressiveness and to avoid bloodshed police had to accede to his demands. Thus he was carried in a palanquin with Bands and trumpets to Dunav and further on a war horse.

After Independence 

Dr. Hardayal Pant appointed him as an organizer of regional security groups. There were 36 posts functioning under him. They had 460 rifles, 8 machine guns and 50,000 cartridges. Later on he was appointed as a guide to a panel who surveyed McMahon line along with China border, on 19 November 1949 they returned from the border. Later on he was sent to Niti Mana, where he trained 600-odd local citizens on assault rifles as area-defense groups. Then he was moved to police training center in Moradabad. In 1951 he met Govind Ballabh Pant and expressed his desire to work for the public in Garhwal and Kumayun region. The same year assembly election were to be held and he demanded a ticket for the same but Mr. Pant denied on the pretext of his being required in more valuable work by the government. But Ram Prasad Nautiyal took an appointment with central leadership of Congress and met Nehru ji. Thus he successfully fought Uttar Pradesh assembly election from Lansdowne twice in a row.

As an MLA from Lansdowne constituency 

In first ever assembly elections in independent India in 1951 he defeated Shri Padma Datt by 5647 votes from Lansdowne East constituency.
(http://www.elections.in/uttar-pradesh/assembly-constituencies/1951-election-results.html)

In 1957 he got 12824 votes and won the Lansdowne East seat once again.
(http://www.elections.in/uttar-pradesh/assembly-constituencies/1957-election-results.html)

In his two terms as a member of Legislative Assembly from Lansdowne East constituency he worked on spreading a network of motor roads in the region and by opening cooperative societies he prioritized economic empowerment of public.

Ram Nagar – Marchula – Beironkhal – Thalisain motor road and Deriyakhal – RikhniKhal – Beironkhal motor road

Ram Nagar – Marchula – Beironkhal – Thalisain motor road and Deriyakhal – RikhniKhal – Beironkhal motor road are his measure achievements, both the motor road links were completed by the help of local public, later on when Ram Nagar-Beironkhal road was completed there were no buses to ply through the route. He campaigned for Cooperative societies and collected fund to buy two second-hand buses. Most of the parts of these roads are now given a status of National Highways.

Users Transport society Ltd and Daalagaon drinking water scheme

In 1957 he started working on Users Transport society Ltd; and got it stablished in 1958. In his leadership Users Transport Society had 24 buses plying on different routes in Garhwal and Kumayun region. Daalagaon drinking water scheme was another measure work, this scheme provided potable water to dozens of village scattered in the vicinity.

For the financial inclusion and empowerment of the public he established cooperative banks in Lansdowne, Beironkhal, Naugaonkhal etc. He himself bought shares of these banks and encouraged the public to do so.

Death 
Due to his rebellious attitude, he started feeling uncomfortable with the ruling leaders. He was public figure who was comfortable in common public only, not in power, he left the opportunities given by the government and participated the assembly elections to work for the people. By sixties he established himself as a visionary leader by building roads, drinking water schemes and financial institutions (like co-operative banks). Later he detached from ever deteriorating active politics, and spent his last days in solitude in Kotdwar. On 12 December 1980, he died in Lucknow

References

http://www.elections.in/uttar-pradesh/assembly-constituencies/#info_id12
http://www.empoweringindia.org/new/constituency.aspx?eid=610&cid=31
https://www.tribuneindia.com/article/cm-inaugurates-1500-kw-dunav-hydro-power-project/511226/amp
https://www.navbharattimes.indiatimes.com/business/business-news/trivandhar-rawat-releases-1500-kw-hydel-project/amp_articleshow/62009698.cms
https://www.jagran.com/uttarakhand/dehradun-city-ironman-of-garhwal-captain-ram-prasad-nautiyal-jagran-special-22934912.html
https://amritmahotsav.nic.in/unsung-heroes-detail.htm?3713

Indian revolutionaries
Revolutionary movement for Indian independence
Culture of Uttarakhand
Garhwal division
People from Pauri Garhwal district
1905 births
1980 deaths
People from Uttarakhand